Caledonia High School (CHS) is a public high school located in Caledonia, Minnesota, United States, that serves Caledonia as well as the surrounding communities of Brownsville, Eitzen, Freeburg, and Reno. Caledonia High School's mascot is the "Warrior" and the school colors are black and vegas gold.

History
The original Caledonia High School building now serves as the grade school.  During the 2002–03 school year, the new Middle/High school building was finished.  In the 2009-10 year, Paul DeMorett took over administration of the school, and in 2012–13, Ben Barton took over as the superintendent.

Sports

Boys basketball
In 1997 Caledonia High School defeated DeLaSalle with a score of 69–47 to win the MSHSL Class AA Men's Basketball State Championship (Undefeated)/

Girls basketball
In 2009 Caledonia High School defeated Howard Lake-Waverly-Winsted with a score of 54–50 to win the MSHSL AA Girls Basketball State Championship (Undefeated).

Football
In 1976 Caledonia High School defeated Sartell with a score of 38–7 to win the Class B MSHSL State Football Championship (Undefeated). In 2007 Caledonia High School defeated Luverne with a score of 14–7 to win the MSHSL Class AA Football Championship. In 2008 Caledonia High School defeated Luverne with a score of 47–7 to win the MSHSL Class AA Football Championship.

In 2010 Caledonia High School defeated Triton with a score of 28–7 to win the MSHSL Class AA Football Championship (Undefeated). In 2011 Caledonia High School defeated Moose Lake with a score of 27–0 to win the MSHSL Class AA Football Championship. In 2012 Caledonia High School defeated Moose Lake with a score of 25–22 to win the MSHSL Class AA Football Championship (Undefeated). In 2013, Caledonia High School was defeated by Chatfield High School in overtime following an interception in the end zone. Chatfield subsequently went on to win the State Championship. In 2015 Caledonia High School defeated Pipestone with a score of 40–0 to win the MSHSL Class AA Football Championship (Undefeated). In 2016 Caledonia High School defeated Eden Valley-Watkins with a score of 61–12 to win the MSHSL Class AA Football Championship (Undefeated). In 2017 Caledonia High School defeated Pipestone with a score of 57–6 to win the MSHSL Class AA Football Championship (Undefeated). In 2018 Caledonia High School defeated Paynesville with a score of 40–6 to win the MSHSL Class AA Football Championship (Undefeated).[   In 2019 Caledonia High School defeated Minneapolis North with a score of 26–0 to win the MSHSL Class AA Football Championship (Undefeated).[

Track and field
In 2011 Caledonia/Spring Grove Track & Field team became the MSHSL Class A State Champions.

Wrestling
In 1970 Caledonia High School's wrestling team became the MSHSL Wrestling State Champions/

References

External links
Caledonia Area Public Schools website

Schools in Houston County, Minnesota
Public high schools in Minnesota
School buildings completed in 2002
2002 establishments in Minnesota